Senator Lowe may refer to:

David Perley Lowe (1823–1882), Kansas State Senate
Enos Lowe (1804–1880), Iowa State Senate
Paul A. Lowe Jr. (born 1959), North Carolina State Senate

See also
Henry R. Low (1826–1888), New York State Senate